The Reserve Infantry Division of Jiangxi() is a reserve infantry formation of the People's Liberation Army.

The Reserve Division of Nanchang() was activated in June 1984 at Nanchang, Jiangxi.  The division was then composed of 3 infantry regiments and 1 artillery regiment:
1st Infantry Regiment - Fengcheng, Jiangxi
2nd Infantry Regiment - Jinxian, Jiangxi
3rd Infantry Regiment - Xinjian, Jiangxi
Artillery Regiment - Nanchang, Jiangxi

In November 1985, the division was redesignated as the Reserve Infantry Division of Nanchang().

In September 1998, the Anti-Aircraft Artillery Regiment, Reserve Infantry Division of Nanchang was activated from the artillery regiment. 

In September 1999, the division was redesignated as the Reserve Infantry Division of Jiangxi.

In 2004, the Artillery Regiment, Reserve Infantry Division of Jiangxi was reactivated.

By 2020 the division was composed of:
1st Infantry Regiment - Yichun, Jiangxi
2nd Infantry Regiment - Ganzhou, Jiangxi
3rd Infantry Regiment - Jiujiang, Jiangxi
Artillery Regiment - Ji'an, Jiangxi
Anti-Aircraft Artillery Regiment - Nanchang, Jiangxi.

References

Reserve divisions of the People's Liberation Army
Military units and formations established in 1984